The Bank of Slovenia is the bank of issue and the central bank of the Republic of Slovenia.  Based in Ljubljana, it was established on 25 June 1991. It is a non-governmental independent institution, obliged to periodically present a report on its operation to the National Assembly of Slovenia. Its primary task is to take care of the stability of the domestic currency and to ensure the liquidity of payments within the country and with foreign countries.  It also acts as the supervisor of the banking system.

The Bank of Slovenia joined the Eurosystem in 2007, when the euro replaced the tolar as the official currency of Slovenia.

Governors 
France Arhar (1991–2001)
Mitja Gaspari (2001–2007) 
Marko Kranjec (2007–2013) 
Boštjan Jazbec (2013–2018) 
Boštjan Vasle (since 2019)

See also 
Economy of Slovenia
List of central banks
Eurozone

References

External links
  Bank of Slovenia official site
Financial data for Slovenia
Statistical Office of the Republic of Slovenia

Slovenia
Slovenia
Slovenia
1991 establishments in Slovenia
Banks established in 1991